The South Carolina Code of Laws, also SC Code of Laws, is the compendium of all laws in the U.S. state of South Carolina. Divided into 62 chapters, the code provides a legal interpretation of all rights and punishments to all citizens of South Carolina.

History

Record of Law in the Colonial Period 

The English Royal Charter of March 1663 that handed the eight Lords' Proprietors of Carolina the land composing of modern-day North Carolina, South Carolina, and Georgia spurred an actual colonizing expedition and the drafting of a founding constitution. In 1670 Proprietor Lord Anthony Ashley Cooper and famed philosopher John Locke combined to realize the first revised colonial constitution accepted by the body Proprietorship. The importance to legal history of this first constitution is that it actually banned legal practice as a profession and sought to simplify legal dictates so that under educated nobles could run the colony effectively. The 1670 constitution banned legal commentary and established eight administrative courts whose aristocratic members composed part of a Grand Council that would prepare legislation produced in the colony's parliament. The journal of the Grand Council would, due to that body's power, become the first legislative record of the Carolina colony but also contains judicial rulings and executive actions undertaken due to the council's fiat. Chief Justice Nicholas Trott compiled the first comprehensive record of parliamentary statutes in 1712 which covered all the preceding years from 1682, with the majority being English common law statutes that could still apply in a vastly different environment. The collection of South Carolina colonial and state laws released by Judge John Grimke in 1790 includes the record from before Trott's time in office up until the formation of the United States.

Record of Law between Independence and the American Civil War 
The next compendium of South Carolina law would be gathered and edited by legal reformer Dr. Thomas Cooper.  Cooper acted under a resolution passed by the General Assembly in December 1834 to "compile under his direction the statute law of the state, now of force". Cooper commented of his task,

I am required to compile an edition of the Statute Law of South-Carolina: Is it to be an imperfect and mutilated edition of our public Law, or one that will answer the description of the 'Statutes at Large'? I have preferred the latter: because, it is better to insert somewhat too much than somewhat too little: because, the reasons for a present law, are often derived from, and the law itself elucidated by, the imperfections it is meant to supersede -.

Cooper died before the fifth volume went to the publisher leading to the appointment of Dr. David James Mccord by Governor Patrick Noble to finish the project. The tenth and final volume, an index, was published in 1841. Legislative year books published by the General Assembly would continue to proliferate, covering the time period from Mccord's work through the American Civil War. Volumes in the format seen of The Statutes at Large would have to wait until after the massive upheaval of the 1860s, to be added for the collective educational benefit of South Carolina's legal community.

Titles of the South Carolina Code of Laws 2016 

Title 1 - Administration of the Government 

Title 2- General Assembly 

Title 3- U.S. Government, Agreements and Relations with 

Title 4- Counties 

Title 5- Municipal Corporations 

Title 6- Local Government: Provisions Applicable to Special Purpose Districts and Other Political Subdivisions 

Title 7- Elections 

Title 8- Public Officers and Employees 

Title 9- Retirement Systems 

Title 10- Public Buildings and Property 

Title 11- Public Finance 

Title 12- Taxation 

Title 13- Planning, Research and Development 

Title 14- Courts 

Title 15- Civil Remedies and Procedures 

Title 16- Crimes and Offenses 

Title 17- Criminal Procedures 

Title 18- Appeals 

Title 19- Evidence 

Title 20- Domestic Relations 

Title 21- Estates, Trusts, Fiduciaries 

Title 22- Magistrates and Constables 

Title 23- Law Enforcement and Public Safety 

Title 24- Corrections, Jails, Probations, Paroles and Pardons 

Title 25- Military, Civil Defense and Veteran Affairs 

Title 26- Notaries Public and Acknowledgements 

Title 27- Property and Conveyances 

Title 28- Eminent Domain 

Title 29- Mortgages and Other Liens 

Title 30- Public Records 

Title 31- Housing and Redevelopment 

Title 32- Contracts and Agents 

Title 33- Corporations, Partnerships, and Associations 

Title 34- Banking, Financial Institutions, and Money 

Title 35- Securities 

Title 36- Commercial Code 

Title 37- Consumer Protection Code 

Title 38- Insurance 

Title 39- Trade and Commerce 

Title 40- Professions and Occupations 

Title 41- Labor and Employment 

Title 42- Workers' Compensation 

Title 43- Social Services 

Title 44- Health 

Title 45- Hotels, Motels, Restaurants and Boardinghouses 

Title 46- Agriculture 

Title 47- Animals, Livestock and Poultry 

Title 48- Environmental Protection and Conservation 

Title 49- Waters, Water Resources and Drainage 

Title 50- Fish, Game and Watercraft 

Title 51- Parks, Recreation and Tourism 

Title 52- Amusements and Athletic Contests 

Title 53- Sundays, Holidays and Other Special Days 

Title 54- Ports and Maritime Matters 

Title 55- Aeronautics 

Title 56- Motor Vehicles 

Title 57- Highways, Bridges and Ferries 

Title 58- Public Utilities, Services and Carriers 

Title 59- Education 

Title 60- Libraries, Archives, Museums and Arts 

Title 61- Alcohol and Alcoholic Beverages 

Title 62- South Carolina Probate Code 

 Title 63- South Carolina Children's Code 
  Chapter 19 Articles 1-23 established the*South Carolina Department of Juvenile Justice and outlined the means and methods by which minors in the state can be prosecuted and subsequently incarcerated if convicted. This chapter was a part of South Carolina House Bill H.4747, passed in 2008, that established the Children's Code so as to combine aspects of the extant South Carolina Family Court, child crime, and child support statutes.

References

Legal history of South Carolina
South Carolina statutes
United States state legal codes